The Penguin English Library is an imprint of Penguin Books. The series was first created in 1963 as a 'sister series' to the Penguin Classics series, providing critical editions of English classics; at that point in time, the Classics label was reserved for works translated into English (for example, Juvenal's Sixteen Satires). The English Library was merged into the Classics stable in the mid 1980s, and all titles hitherto published in the Library were reissued as Classics.

The imprint was resurrected in 2012 for a new series of titles. The present English Library no longer seeks to provide critical editions; the focus is now 'on the beauty and elegance of the book'.

History

1963 to 1986 
The Penguin English Library aimed to publish 'a comprehensive range of the literary masterpieces which have appeared in the English language since the 15th century'. All texts in the Library were published with an introduction and explanatory notes written and compiled by an editor; some with a bibliography as well. Editors were also required to provide 'authoritative texts', using their own judgement in printing one, or in some cases creating their own. The series was recognisable chiefly by its distinctive orange spine.

Most, if not all, titles were reprinted as Penguin Classics following the merger of the two imprints in the mid 1980s. Some of these editions were superseded in the 1990s or later, while some continue to be reprinted today as Classics. Additionally, the introductions to some titles survive in present-day Penguin Classics as appendices – for example, Tony Tanner's introduction to Mansfield Park.

2012 to present 
The imprint was resurrected in name, though not so much in spirit, in 2012. Texts published in the series no longer include critical apparatus; they instead feature an essay by a notable literary figure, usually excerpted from prior work - for example, the essays of Harold Bloom, V. S. Pritchett and John Sutherland have been featured. A portrait or photograph of the author remains printed on the inside of the front cover. The focus is now on cover art, with each title designed by Coralie Bickford-Smith.

List of English Library titles 
This is an incomplete list of the titles in the Penguin English Library:

1963 to 1986 
All titles listed below are assumed to have lists of further reading appended and/or are no longer in print having been superseded by new editions, unless stated.

2012 to present

References 

Series of books
Penguin Books book series
Book publishing companies of the United Kingdom